Willowbrook is an area in northwest Houston, Texas, United States bordered by the Cutten Road to the east, Grant to the north, Rockland to the west, and Beltway 8 to the south. Sam Houston Race Park is one mile away.

Government and infrastructure
The Houston Police Department (HPD) serves Willowbrook from the North Belt Police Station. The station opened in January 2018. HPD previously served it as part of the Northwest Patrol Division. The department previously operated the Willowbrook Storefront.

Houston Fire Department (HFD) built a temporary Station #96 at West Greens Road and Mills in 1995. In 1999 a new Station #96 was built at Willow Chase and Breton Ridge to service the Willowbrook Mall area and opened in 2000.

Houston City Council District A covers Willowbrook. As of 2008 Toni Lawrence represents the district.

Unincorporated areas around Willowbrook are within Harris County Sheriff's Office North Patrol Division.

Neighborhoods
Neighborhoods located in Willowbrook:

Willowbrook
Willow Chase Park
Centerfield

Communities Surrounding Willowbrook:

 Champion Forest
 Greenwood Forest
 Cypress
 Northwest Park

Demographics
According to the 2000 census, the current population of Willowbrook Super Neighborhood #1 is 2,741.

Education
Students living in the district are zoned to the Cypress-Fairbanks Independent School District.
 Francone and Hancock Elementary Schools (separate sections)
 Bleyl and Campbell Middle Schools (separate sections)
 Cypress Creek High School

See also
 Willowbrook Mall

References

Further reading
 Harris County Block Book Maps: Willowbrook Regional Wastewater Treatment Plant (PDF or JPG). Volume 118, Page 467.

External links
Area of Willowbrook
Demographics of Willowbrook

Neighborhoods in Houston